Subaie' (also spelled Alsubaie', Sbei', and Subei) is an Arabian tribe living in the center of southern Najd.

History 
The family is of North Arabian (Adnanite) stock, and traces its lineage to the large, ancient tribe of Banu 'Amir, also known as 'Amir ibn Sa'sa'a, who came to dominate central Arabia in the medieval period. Al-Subaies were Prophet Mohammed's knights. Also, they were the knights of Saudi 1, Saudi 2, and The Kingdom of Saudi Arabia until now.

At the turn of the 20th century, they comprised both nomadic (bedouin) and sedentary sections. 

The original grazing lands of the family's bedouins had been the region of Ranyah and Kurmah, on the border between Nejd and 'Asir. They ended up roaming the areas of central Nejd around Riyadh, along with the closely related family of the Suhool. Some sections, though, moved further north, where they later established the town of Rumah. Today, they are mostly found in Saudi Arabia, Qatar, United Arab Emirates, and Kuwait.

The sedentary members, on the other hand, have mostly resided in central Arabia for centuries, a possible legacy of Banu 'Amir's heyday. Families that belong to Subay' can be found in practically every town in the region, making up a disproportionate amount of central Arabia's traditional sedentary population.

Demographics 
Subaie's population is nearly 5.000.000-7.000.000 people all around central and north of the Arabian Peninsula, located in the Middle East.

Notable people 
Among the tribe's members are: 

 Saleh Al-Luhaidan, Saudi scholar and one of the member of the Council of Senior Scholars
 Abdul Rahman Al-Sumait, Kuwaiti philanthropist
 Mohammed Al-Jadaan, Saudi Finance Minister
 Abdullah bin Abdulaziz Al Rabeeah, Saudi pediatric surgeon and former minister of health 
 Tawfig Al-Rabiah, Saudi Minister of Hajj and Umrah

References 

Tribes of Arabia
Tribes of Saudi Arabia
Banu 'Amir